King Island is an island on the Coast of the Canadian province of British Columbia. A number of other islands separate King Island from the open sea of Queen Charlotte Sound.

King Island is separated from the mainland by Dean Channel to the north, Burke Channel to the south, and Labouchere Channel to the east. Fisher Channel, essentially an extension of Dean Channel, separates King Island from several islands to the west, including Denny Island and Hunter Island. Fisher Channel and Burke Channel join at the southern end of King Island, becoming Fitz Hugh Sound.

In the Nuxalk language the island's name is Nuxalknalus, "centre of Nuxalk Territory".

King Island was named in 1793 by George Vancouver, in honor of the family of Captain James King, under whom Vancouver had served as a midshipman on the Discovery during the latter part of the third voyage of James Cook. Dean Channel and Raphoe Point was named after James King (1715–1795), Dean of Raphoe.

See also
King Island Pluton

References

Islands of British Columbia
Central Coast of British Columbia
Nuxalk